Samuel Louis Mosinger (180420 April 1872) was a prominent Croatian businessman, merchant and member of the "Varaždin charity society", the first and oldest such society in Croatia.

Mosinger was born in Varaždin to a Jewish family. He was a member of the presidency council and president of the Varaždin Jewish community since 1828. In 1844, Mosinger and Samuel Leitner were the first Jews who became members of the "Varaždin charity society", founded to help poor and needy citizens of Varaždin and surrounding areas. Mosinger was a well known supporter of the poor, and especially school youth regardless to religious affiliation. In 1865, because of his numerous and versatile merits for the "Varaždin charity society", he was knighted by Franz Joseph I of Austria. Mosinger was elected as the treasurer of the "Varaždin charity society" in 1851, and has been on that position until his death in 1872. He wrote "The short history of the Varaždin charity society" which is preserved at the Varaždin City Museum. Mosinger died in 1872 after a short and serious illness. "Agramer Zeitung" wrote with great sadness about his death, with a huge crowd attending the funeral.

Books

References

Bibliography 

1804 births
1872 deaths
People from Varaždin
Croatian Jews
Austro-Hungarian Jews
Croatian Austro-Hungarians
Croatian businesspeople
Croatian philanthropists
Jewish philanthropists
Recipients of the Order of Franz Joseph
19th-century philanthropists
History of Varaždin